Laëtitia Payet (born 2 October 1985 in Meslan) is a French judoka who competes in the women's 48 kg category. At the 2012 Summer Olympics, she was defeated in the second round. At the 2016 Summer Olympics, she was eliminated by Mönkhbatyn Urantsetseg in the second round.

References

External links
 
 
 

French female judoka
Living people
Sportspeople from Morbihan
Olympic judoka of France
Judoka at the 2012 Summer Olympics
Judoka at the 2016 Summer Olympics
1985 births
Mediterranean Games bronze medalists for France
Competitors at the 2009 Mediterranean Games
Mediterranean Games medalists in judo
21st-century French women